Birchwood Park is a business park in Birchwood near Warrington, United Kingdom.

During World War II it was the site of Risley Royal Ordnance Factory. It was then used by the Admiralty as a storage depot until 1961, except for the north west section which was taken over by UKAEA in 1956.

Business parks of England